is a junction passenger railway station in the city of Kiryū, Gunma, Japan, operated by the private railway operator Tōbu Railway and the third sector Watarase Keikoku Railway.

Lines

Station layout

Aioi Station has two opposed side platforms for the Watarase Keikoku Railway and one island platform for the Tōbu Railway, with both sets of platforms connected to the station building by a footbridge. Both companies share the same set of ticket barriers.

Platforms

Adjacent stations

History
Aioi Station opened on the Ashio Line on 15 April 1911, with the name written using the kanji characters . The kanji characters were changed to the present name on 1 July 1913.

From 17 March 2012, station numbering was introduced on all Tōbu lines, with Aioi Station becoming "TI-56".

Passenger statistics
In fiscal 2019, the station was used by an average of 698 passengers daily (boarding passengers only).

Surrounding area
 Kiryū Aioi Post Office

See also
 List of railway stations in Japan

References

External links

 Tobu Railway station information 
 Watarase Keikoku Railway station information 
	

Tobu Kiryu Line
Stations of Tobu Railway
Railway stations in Gunma Prefecture
Railway stations in Japan opened in 1911
Kiryū, Gunma